In Shanghai is a live concert recording made by the Toshiko Akiyoshi Jazz Orchestra featuring Lew Tabackin in October, 2010 in Shanghai.  An audio CD version was released by Pony Canyon in Japan in January, 2011 and a DVD video version was released in March of the same year.  Although the New York-based Orchestra had officially disbanded in 2003, they have reformed on occasion to perform special tours and concerts like this one.

Track listing

CD
All compositions and arrangements by Toshiko Akiyoshi except as noted.  
"Long Yellow Road"
"I Know Who Loves You"
"My Teacher, Mr. Yang"
"Kangding Qingge" (康定情歌 = "Kangding Love Song", traditional Chinese ballad)
"Drum Conference"
"Hope"

DVD video
opening 
"Long Yellow Road"
"My Teacher, Mr. Yang"
"I Know Who Loves You"
"Kangding Qingge" 
"Autumn Sea"
"Drum Conference"
"Hope"
(also additional DVD bonus material)

Personnel
Toshiko Akiyoshi – piano
Lew Tabackin – tenor saxophone, flute   
Tom Christensen – tenor saxophone   
Dave Pietro – alto saxophone, flute   
David Bixler – alto saxophone  
Mark Lopeman – baritone saxophone   
Dan Levine – trombone  
Alan Ferber – trombone 
Andy Hunter – trombone  
Tim Newman – bass trombone 
Mike Ponella – trumpet  
John Eckert – trumpet 
Joe Magnarelli – trumpet 
Alex Sipiagin – trumpet 
Paul Gill – bass 
Andy Watson – drums 
Wilson "Chembo" Corneil – congas  
Special guests
Monday Michiru – vocal  
王 顛 – 二胡 (erhu)
範 再 – 古箏 (zheng)
呉 暁光 – 大太鼓 (ōdaiko)

References

Pony Canyon PCCY-30181 (CD)

Toshiko Akiyoshi – Lew Tabackin Big Band albums
2011 live albums
Concert films
Toshiko Akiyoshi Jazz Orchestra video albums